Speak and Destroy is the first full-length album released by the metal band My Ruin.

Track listing

UK release
 "Prologue" - 0:06
 "Terror" - 5:25
 "Preacher" - 3:33
 "Tainted Love" - 3:45
 "Blasphemous Girl" - 3:43
 "Close Your Eyes" - 5:30
 "Absolution" - 3:27
 "Horrible Pain (Within My Heart)" - 4:07
 "Monster" - 3:41
 "Sick With It" - 3:41
 "My Beautiful Flower" - 4:17
 "Diavolina" - 4:45
 "June 10" - 4:38
 "Bright Red Scream" - 4:01
 "Cosmetic" - 4:05
 "Sycophant" - 3:59
 "Epilogue" - 0:43
 "Beware Of God" - 0:28

US release
 "Prologue"
 "Terror"
 "Preacher" (Live)
 "Tainted Love" (Remix)
 "Blasphemous Girl"
 "Close Your Eyes"
 "Absolution"
 "Horrible Pain (Within My Heart)"
 "Fever"
 "Sick With It"
 "My Beautiful Flower"
 "Diavolina"
 "June 10"
 "Masochrist"
 "Cosmetic"
 "Sycophant"
 "Epilogue"
 "Beware Of God"

References

1999 debut albums
My Ruin albums
Snapper Music albums
Spitfire Records albums